Christopher Sangster (1 May 1908 – 27 February 1995) was an Australian cricketer. He played in two first-class matches for South Australia in 1927/28.

See also
 List of South Australian representative cricketers

References

External links
 

1908 births
1955 deaths
Australian cricketers
South Australia cricketers
Cricketers from Adelaide